Walter Johnson (23 October 1913 – 7 September 1999) was an Australian rules footballer who played with Footscray in the Victorian Football League (VFL).

Notes

External links 

1913 births
1999 deaths
Australian rules footballers from Melbourne
Western Bulldogs players
People from Yarraville, Victoria